Tommy Czeschin (born June 15, 1979) is an American snowboarder. He competed in the men's halfpipe event at the 2002 Winter Olympics.

Czeschin and his friend Andy Finch participated on the 19th season of The Amazing Race. They ended up in 4th place out of 11 teams and were the eighth team eliminated after finishing last at Panamá Viejo in Panama City. He and Andy won six out of twelve legs on The Amazing Race 19.

References

External links
 
 Andy and Tommy's The Amazing Race 19 Official Profile

1979 births
Living people
American male snowboarders
Olympic snowboarders of the United States
Snowboarders at the 2002 Winter Olympics
People from Mammoth Lakes, California
The Amazing Race (American TV series) contestants
20th-century American people
21st-century American people